James Beal may refer to:
 James Beal (boxer) (1929–1996), New Zealand boxer
 James Hartley Beal (1861–1945), Ohio educator, legislator, author, and pharmacist
 James Beal (cricketer) (1830–1904), Australian cricketer
 James Beal (reformer) (1829–1891), English land agent, auctioneer and political radical

See also
 James Beale (disambiguation)
 James Beall (disambiguation)